Milk Coffee is a Chinese pop-music group consisting of Kiki (singer/lyricist), and Ge Fei (Keyboard/guitar/arranger and producer).

History
KiKi was in high school when met Gefei through QQ. They chatted about music. After entering the university, KiKi and Gefei built a band with two other classmates and participated in the Campus Band Competition, however resulting in a loss.  The band was forced to disband due to their graduation. Both previous students built the band "Milk@Coffee". According to them, the purpose of their music was just a way of life.

KiKi said, “In 2004, I met a stranger in Gefei's home, she asked me if I want to be an artisan. I couldn't believe at that time. The stranger, is our broker. She listened to our music, through friends' introduction. " Milk@Coffee joined Modern Sky Company, and debut by the album "Burn! Little Universe". In 2008 and in 2009, they released album "Youth is blue" and "Got used to the loneliness". "Got used to the loneliness" was released with the book "Loneliness leads us to grow up", which is written by Kiki.

In 2009, they changed Milk@Coffee into Milk Coffee. They left Modern Sky Company and joined Huayi Bros. Media Group. The new albums, "Give You Some Color" "Lost & Found~To find it" and "You can not love me" make them more famous in China.

Members
 Kiki
 Original Name: Fu Yan富妍
 Lead singer / lyricist
 Birth: April 8, 1982
 Birthplace: Beijing
 Alma mater: Beijing Technology and Business University

 Gefei
 Original Name: 周格非
 Keyboard / Production
 Birthday: March 23, 1982
 Birthplace: Beijing
 Alma mater: Beijing Technology and Business University

Discography

Albums
Burn! Little Universe(燃烧吧！小宇宙)，2005
Youth is blue(越长大越孤单)，2008
Got used to the loneliness(习惯了寂寞)，2009
Give You Some Color(给你点儿颜色)，September 2010
Lost & Found~To find it(Lost & Found 去寻找)，September 2011
You can not love me(你不能爱我)，September 2012

Singles
Next World (For cartoon《星游记》（Rainbow Sea）)June.12th 2012
Believe Youth(信仰年轻) May 24, 2013

Comment
Their music is just like milk coffee, fresh and mellow. Unlike others, Ge Fei (Keyboard / guitar / arranger and producer) has perfect skills in playing the piano and the guitar, makes their music classical and romantic. Kiki, the lead singer & lyricist, has sweet voice. Also, the lyrics she writes are very lovely.

References

Chinese pop music groups
Mandopop musical groups
Musical groups established in 2004
Musical groups from Beijing
Pop music duos